Carol Saline is a journalist, broadcaster, author and public speaker.

Career 
She has written eight books. They include Dr. Snow: How the FBI Nailed an Ivy League Coke King, Straight Talk: How to Get Closer to Others by Saying What You Really Mean, and A Guide to Good Health.

Along with photographer Sharon Wohlmuth, she has co-authored five photo-essay books. Their most popular, Sisters, spent 63 weeks on the New York Times bestseller list and sold over one million copies. It was followed by Mothers & Daughters, which hit No. 1 on every national best-seller list. A third bestseller, Best Friends, completed this trilogy. A fourth book, Sisters: 10th Anniversary Edition, came out in October 2004. A day in the life of the American Woman, was published in October 2005.

Since 1974, Saline has worked as a senior writer at Philadelphia Magazine where she specializes in health, profiles, and investigative reporting. Her articles have appeared in Reader’s Digest, Family Circle, More, Redbook, Self  and Cosmo Girl.

Saline hosted The Fretz Kitchen, a daily cooking program on CN8.  For nearly a decade, she appeared as a regular panelist on the Sunday public affairs program, Inside Story. Her national television appearances include The Oprah Winfrey Show, The Phil Donahue Show, Larry King Live, American Journal, Inside Edition, CBS Good Morning, The Weekend Today Show and Good Morning America.

She is an active speaker and moderator who gives lectures and workshops nationwide.

Personal life 
A graduate of Syracuse University, Saline holds a dual degree in English and Journalism. While in school, she was a member of Sigma Delta Tau sorority. She has two children and resides in Philadelphia with her second husband, Paul Rathblott.

Awards

Writing
 Two-time winner of the National Magazine Award
 Three Clarions for print feature writing from Women in Communications
 Charles Stuart Mott and The International Reading Association Awards for educational writing
 Health Journalism Award from the American Society of Chiropractors
 Four “Sarahs” from Women in Communications, which cited her as a “Super Communicator”

Social Causes
1984 “Woman of Achievement,” the Delaware County Domestic Abuse Project
1987 “Woman of Achievement,” Women in Transition
1990 Myrtle Wreath Award by Camden County Hadassah
1995“Woman of Achievement,” Melitta Benz
1996“Woman of Achievement,” Montgomery County Woman's Center

References

External links
 Carol Saline official website

American women journalists
Living people
Year of birth missing (living people)
Syracuse University alumni
21st-century American women